The 1911 election for Mayor of Los Angeles took place on October 31, 1911, with a run-off election on December 5, 1911. Incumbent George Alexander was re-elected for a second full term against Job Harriman.

Municipal elections in California, including Mayor of Los Angeles, are officially nonpartisan; candidates' party affiliations do not appear on the ballot.

Election 
Incumbent George Alexander had been elected in March 1909 and was now seeking a second term. He was challenged by Job Harriman, an ordained minister and Socialist, William C. Mushet, who ran in the previous election, Miles S. Gregory, a fellow Republican and Councilmember, and James O. Becker, a Socialist Labor candidate.

In the primary, Harriman had an 8-point lead above Alexander, and Harriman stated that he believed that he had "been without doubt nominated for mayor of [Los Angeles]." However, in the general election, Alexander won due to Harriman's association with James and John McNamara, who he was one of the lawyers for during their trial for the Los Angeles Times bombing.

Results

Primary election

General election

References and footnotes

External links
 Office of the City Clerk, City of Los Angeles

1911
1911 California elections
Los Angeles
1910s in Los Angeles